Patricia Ann Pauley (born 27 August 1943) is a British former figure skater who competed in ladies' singles. She is a two-time British national champion (1959, 1960) and competed at the 1960 Winter Olympics, placing 15th. She came in seventh at the 1958 and 1960 World Championships.

Life and career
Born in London to Edward George Claude Pauley and Ludawicka Spiess from Vienna, Austria, Patricia now resides in London with her husband Gordon Foster and children. 
Patricia turned professional and skated around the world with Holiday on Ice.

Results

References

British female single skaters
1941 births
Olympic figure skaters of Great Britain
Figure skaters at the 1960 Winter Olympics
Sportspeople from London
Living people